Lalchand Kataria (born 12 June 1968) is an Indian politician belonging to the Indian National Congress. He was elected to the Lok Sabha, the lower house of the Parliament of India, from Jaipur Rural, Rajasthan in 2009. He was the Minister of State for Defense in the Second Manmohan Singh ministry. He was later elected as a Member of the Rajasthan Legislative Assembly from Amer Constituency in 2003, a position he currently holds. He has been the cabinet minister of Rajasthan from the year 2018.

References

External links
Official Biographical Sketch in Lok Sabha Website

Indian National Congress politicians
Living people
1968 births
India MPs 2009–2014
Lok Sabha members from Rajasthan
Politicians from Jaipur
Rajasthan MLAs 2018–2023
Indian National Congress politicians from Rajasthan